Albert Léon Guérard (1880–1959) was a prominent scholar of comparative literature. Guérard taught at Stanford University for many years. A prolific author, he published works on French and European civilization, world literature, and international languages, also holding the position of protector of the Occidental language's Occidental-Academie in 1936.

Books 
 Testament of a liberal. Harvard University Press, 1956.
 Art for art's sake. Lothrop, Lee and Shepard Company, 1936.
 Education of a humanist. Harvard University Press, 1949.
 Preface to world literature. H. Holt and Company, 1940.
 Five masters of French romance with Anatole France, Pierre Loti, Paul Bourget, Maurice Barrès, Romain Rolland. Scribners, 1916.

Historical works 
 French Prophets of Yesterday: A Study of Religious Thought Under the Second Empire.(1913) online; broad-range survey of many French intellectuals 
  (1914)
 A Short History of the International Language Movement (1921).  at Google Books
 France in the Classical Age. The Life and Death of an Ideal. Scribners, 1928. .
 Napoleon III (1943) .
 France: A Short History. Norton, 1946.
 Napoleon I. (1957)
 French civilization from its origins to the close of the middle ages. (1920)
 Napoléon III. Harvard University Press, 1943.
 Beyond hatred; the democratic ideal in France and America. Negro Universities Press, 1969. .

References

External links
 

1880 births
1959 deaths
Comparative literature academics
Stanford University Department of English faculty
Interlingue